is Japanese manga series written and illustrated by Kazuhiro Fujita. It is an anthology of dark fantasy stories in a British setting. Two stories, Springald and Springald Ibun: Mother Goose, were published in Kodansha's Morning from May to August 2007, and collected in a single tankōbon volume. Another story, The Ghost and the Lady, was published in Morning from November 2014 to June 2015, and collected in two tankōbon volumes. A third story, Mikazuki Yo, Kaibutsu to Odore, started in Morning in March 2022. In North America, Kodansha USA licensed The Black Museum: The Ghost and the Lady for English language release.

Publication
The Black Museum is written and illustrated by Kazuhiro Fujita. It is the second serialized work by Fujita published in a seinen manga magazine. Kodansha collected the two stories in a single tankōbon volumes, released on September 21, 2007.

Fujita launched another story, serialized in Morning from November 27, 2014 to June 25, 2015. Kodansha collected the story in two tankōbon volumes, published on July 23, 2015.

A third story, started in Morning on March 10, 2022.

In North America, Kodansha USA announced the license of The Ghost and the Lady manga in March 2016. The first volume was released on October 25 and the second on December 27, 2016.

Volume list

Springald

The Ghost and the Lady

Reception
The Black Museum: The Ghost and the Lady placed third on Takarajimasha's Kono Manga ga Sugoi! ranking of top 20 manga for male readers.

References

Further reading

External links
 
 

Comics set in the United Kingdom
Dark fantasy anime and manga
Historical fantasy anime and manga
Kodansha manga
Manga anthologies
Seinen manga